Triodia adriaticus is a species of moth belonging to the family Hepialidae. It was described by Osthelder in 1931, and is known from Slovenia, Croatia, North Macedonia and Greece.

References

External links
Hepialidae genera

Hepialidae
Moths described in 1931
Moths of Europe